Technics SL-1200 is a series of direct-drive turntables originally manufactured from October 1972 until 2010, and resumed in 2016, by 
Matsushita Electric (now Panasonic Corporation) under the brand name of Technics. S means "Stereo", L means "Player". Originally released as a high fidelity consumer record player, it quickly became adopted among radio and disco club disc jockeys, thanks to the direct drive, high torque motor design, making it initially suitable for pushbutton cueing and starting of tracks on radio and in dance clubs. It is still extremely popular with audiophiles.

When the use of slip-mats for cueing and beat-mixing (and scratching) became popular in hip hop music, the quartz-controlled high torque motor system enabled records to be mixed with consistency and accuracy. A primary design goal was for hi-fidelity, but having good build quality, control over wow and flutter, and minimized resonance made the equipment particularly suitable for use in nightclubs and other public-address applications. Since its release in 1979, SL-1200MK2 and its successors were the most common turntable for DJing and scratching. Producers, DJs and MCs refer to the Technics turntable as "the 1s and 2s" and the "Wheels of Steel".

1200s are commonly used in recording studios and for non-electronic live music performance. More than 3 million units were sold. It is widely regarded as one of the most durable and reliable turntables ever produced.  Many 1970s units are still in heavy use. In the autumn of 2010, Panasonic announced that the series was to be discontinued. The Technics brand was discontinued at the same time, only to be relaunched in 2014, focusing on higher end and more expensive products. The company was fully aware that Technics was expected to eventually make turntables again, so at the 2016 Consumer Electronics Show, Panasonic announced that they would return in two models named "Grand Class": one a limited run of 1200 globally (1200GAE), and the other a consumer product (1200G). A lighter and less expensive 1200GR model was announced. The more affordable and DJ-oriented SL-1200 MK7 followed in 2019. 

At the London Science Museum, a Technics SL-1210 is on display as one of the pieces of technology that have "shaped the world we live in".

Features
SL-1200 features include:
 Magnetic (no wear), direct drive (low slip) mechanism.
 High torque (1.5 kgf·cm or 0.15 N·m), which means the platter spins at the desired speed almost immediately (0.7 seconds to reach 33 ¹⁄₃ RPM from standstill), and rapidly reacquires the desired speed, without "overshooting", if the platter is dragged or nudged. This aids beatmatching.
 High torque (3.3 kgf·cm for SL-1200G & SL-1200GAE) 
 High torque (2.2 kgf·cm for SL-1200GR)
 High torque (1.8 kgf·cm for SL-1200MK7)
 Low wow and flutter (0.01%) i.e. the platter stays within 1/100 of 1% of the desired speed.
 Heavy base (2.5 kg), and increased isolation of platter from base, reduced the likelihood of feedback or stylus jumping.
 Variable pitch control, allowing the rotational speed to be adjusted from -8% to +8% (for the purpose of beatmatching). Option to select -16% to +16% added (M5G/MK5G/GLD, GAE/G/GR & MK7).
 High reliability: many examples of SL-1200s lasting well over 15 years of heavy use and withstanding physical shock without functional impairment.
 S-shaped tone arm: No longer popular on high end hi-fi turntables.
 Dimensions MK1:  45.3 cm (w) x 36.6 cm (d) x 18 cm (h)
 Dimensions MK2:  45.3 cm (w) x 36 cm (d) x 16.2 cm (h)
 Weight MK2: 11 kg (net, unboxed without lid)
 Weight G/GAE: 18 kg
 Weight GR: 11.5 kg
 Weight MK7: 9.6 kg
 Voltage: 220 V / 110 V (selectable)
 Pitch Control: +/- 8% or +/- 16%
 Starting Time (MK2): 0.7s
 Rotation Speeds: 33-1/3 & 45 rpm 
 Rotation Speeds: 33-1/3, 45 rpm & 78rpm (MK4 MK7, G & GR)

History

The SL-1200 was the most influential turntable. It was developed in 1971 by a team led by Shuichi Obata at Matsushita, which then released it onto the market in 1972. It was adopted by New York City hip hop DJs in the 1970s. As they experimented with the SL-1200 decks, they developed scratching techniques when they found that the motor would continue to spin at the correct RPM even if the DJ wiggled the record back and forth on the platter.

Legacy models

Original model (1972)

SL-1200
The SL-1200 was introduced in 1972 as an evolution to the popular SL-1100. It was dubbed "The Middle Class Player System". It was delivered in two different versions: The SL-1200 came with a tonearm section. The SL-120 came without a tonearm section. An SME tonearm was the usual choice for the audiophile.

MK2 models (1979-2010)
The SL-1200 Mark 2 was introduced in 1979 as an update to the SL-1200. It represented a culmination of Technics Turntable Innovations. It was dubbed as "The Middle Class Quartz Direct Drive". It soon found its way into discos as well as radio stations for airplay because of its vibration damping ability and resistance to feedback, and eventually it became popular with pioneering hip-hop DJs. Following their established formula, Technics offered different model numbers in Europe: the 1200 (silver) and the 1210 (matte black), which were equipped with switchable dual voltage (110V or 220V) power supplies. Initially, there were only silver models (all named 1200 MK2) in official distribution in Japan and the US (Single voltage of 100V/120V accordingly). However, later the 1200 was available in both silver and matte black finishes (in Japan, the introduction of the MK3 in 1989 marked the first official introduction of a black version). Since 1997, the MK2 had the pitch slide potentiometer changed from 6 pin to 8 pin mounting and from 20k ohm to 22k ohm with part number SFDZ122N11-1, followed by SFDZ122N11-2 both made by ALPS.

The earlier MK2 models 1978-1980 or so also have a different construction in the rubber base of the turntable. Initially, these turntables were made with a base that was completely rubber whereas the newer version has 2 separate parts: rubber outside and a bakelite inlay that is considerably easier to take apart.

SL-1200MK2
Released in summer of 1979. this model came in both silver and matte black. The matte black version was available for a limited time in the US market in a 2 pack SL-1200MK2PK. Technics improved the motor and shock resistance and changed the rotary pitch control to a slider style. This became the base model and is the oldest whose production continued until 2010. The older version of this model that was sold from 1979 until around 1983 has a large  plate where the RCA and ground wires enter the unit, while the newer version has a smaller  hole in the rubber where the RCA and ground enter.  International versions of the SL-1200MK2 included switches for line voltage and frequency beneath the platter.

SL-1210MK2

This model came in satin black metallic finish and is nearly the same in function as the SL-1200MK2, although some of the circuitry inside is updated to use fewer types of pots and resistors. The Technics 1210 series also had a switch to change between voltages on the underside of the platter. It was unavailable from official Panasonic dealers in the United States.

MK3 models (1989-1997)

SL-1200MK3
Released in 1989, has a matte black finish like the MK2, gold RCA plugs, and a small gold-foil Technics label on the back. It was destined only for the Japanese market.

SL-1200MK3D
Japan only, factory gold RCA cables, black or silver finish. Pitch reset button. Released in 1997.

SL-1200M3D
Released in 1997, a silver finish like the MK2 (beside silver finish, there are copies with "champagneish" color), a detached dust cover (no hinges), a recessed power switch to prevent DJs from accidentally turning the deck off during use, and no self-locking detent ("click") at the zero point of the pitch adjustment slider, allowing more precise control of pitch near that point. It has a reset button that sets the pitch adjustment to 0, regardless of the actual position of the pitch adjustment slider. In addition the M3D series has unique details: the brand and model label is printed in a single line instead of two; and the stroboscopic light is red with a slightly orange tone. This model also introduced a slot near the counterweight allowing for storage of a second headshell. The M'K'3D was designed for Japanese markets While the M3D without the K was European/US.

SL-1210M3D
This model is the same as the SL-1200M3D except with a matte black finish like the MK2.

MK4 models (1996)

SL-1200MK4
The SL-1200 Mark 4 was introduced in 1996. It was an update to the SL-1200MK2. It was available only in Japan and priced at around $650. It has a matte black finish. This model is aimed at the hi-end audiophile market rather than DJs. It is the last model made with the detent ("click") in the neutral position (+/- 0%) of the pitch adjustment slider. In addition to the existing 33 RPM and 45 RPM buttons, the MK4 added a 78 RPM button. It is designed to be used with regular removable RCA cables (along with a removable ground/earth cable) rather than having hard wired RCA cables like all other 1200/1210 models. The tonearm was different from those in the previous models as it was made from titanium.

MK5 models (2000-2010)

SL-1200MK5
Released on 1 November 2000, this has a silver finish like the MK2, increased range of anti-skate settings from 0–3 grams-force (0–30 mN) to 0–6 grams-force (0–60 mN). The 1200MK5 also has the voltage selector under the platter like the previously improved upon '1210' models. Main difference between '1200MK5' and '1210Mk5' is primarily the colour on these models. However, The 1200 was not only made in silver, It was also produced in Noir (Black) 
Height adjustment can be set between 0 and 6mm.
It carries over many of the improved upon features of the MK3D like the lack of 0 crossing quartz lock for better pitch control & the added spare cartridge holder. 
Current MK5 models have a removable lid as opposed to the MK2 and MK3 removable hinged lid. Unlike some earlier 1200' models, The 1200MK5 also has a voltage select switch under the platter, Previously only found on '1210' models. The MK5 is the last 1200 model to retain an analog pitch control.

SL-1210MK5
SL-1210MK5 has a black finish [noir] like the MK2, and is 'functionally' exactly the same as the SL-1200MK5. [Not to be confused with M5'G']

SL-1200MK5G
Released in 2002, 1200MK5G [Not to be confused with MK5 models] The G model was the first Technics turntable to introduce a 'digitally controlled' pitch adjustment.  With previous pitch ranges between + and - %8. The m5G added +-%8 Value With the 'addition' of a +-%16 button. Also added was the use of an LED globe on the target light (Previously incandescent)  See 1210m5G for more detailed changes.

SL-1210M5G
Released on 1 November 2002, this has a glossy black finish with silver speckles. It was a special 30th-anniversary edition. It was initially launched in Japan only (together with the MK5) but then became internationally available. It switches between ±8% and ±16% ranges for pitch adjustment, and the pitch control is digital which will be the standard for all 1200 models from this point on. It also features blue target lights and blue pitch-number illumination. The brake strength  potentiometer, although still located beneath platter, can now be adjusted, unlike previous models, using a small plastic knob. Minor improvements over Mk2, Mk3, Mk4, & 1200LTD include improved tonearm mounting and oxygen-free copper wire, improved vibration damping in the body, improvements to pitch control accuracy and better LEDs. Available as 120 volt model for the North American market.

MK6 models (2007-2008)
 SL-1200MK6-K & SL-1200MK6-S (released in February 2008 in Japan) with minor improvements including improved tonearm mounting and oxygen-free copper wire, improved vibration damping in the body, improvements to the pitch control accuracy and better LEDs. -S model has a silver finish like the MK2.
 SL-1200MK6K1 Released on 12 December 2007 (in Japan) as a special 35th-anniversary Limited edition of 1200 units. It consisted of a standard black MK6 packaged up with a booklet and gold record.

Special models
These were limited edition versions, with 24 karat gold plated metal parts including tonearm and buttons. Many "non-official" special models of the SL-1200 and SL-1210 appeared over the years, mainly given away as prizes for turntablism, most notably the DMC World Championship, who awarded the winner a pair of 24K gold plated Technics turntables. Due to the customisation trend that has grown in the DJ community, many local events or competitions gave away custom coloured or finished units.

SL-1200LTD (1995)
The SL-1200 Limited Edition was introduced in 1995 commemorating two million units in sales. Only 5,000 units were made. Due to popular demand, an extra 500 units were said to be made at the end of the production run. Like the MK3D, it has a pitch reset button, but differs in that it also has a self-locking detent at the zero position of pitch adjustment. This model has a piano black gloss finish and gold-plated hardware. It was priced at about US$1200.

SL-1200GLD (2004)
Released in 2004, another limited edition model, with only 3,000 units manufactured. 500 released in Japan with the rest split between the US and International markets. It is based on the MK5G model, with blue (instead of the regular white) target lights, a piano black gloss finish, and gold-plated hardware. It was "created to commemorate the 3 Million turntables sold by technics in the last 30 years".

Current models

Grand Class SL-1200 Series (2016-2020)

Development of a completely rebuilt SL-1200 from the ground up with the intent to create a new system for Hi-Fi use and to redefine the direct-drive turntable reference.

SL-1200G
Announced in January 2016 CES in Las Vegas, released in October 2016, SL-1200 Grand Class, an aluminum bound turntable with a high–damping matte magnesium tonearm, a four–layer turntable cabinet, three-layer platter, complete with a microprocessor and the use of a newly developed coreless twin-rotor direct-drive motor with no iron core with rotary positing sensors to eliminate cogging, as well as providing 78 rpm speed compatibility.

SL-1200GAE
 
Announced in January 2016 CES in Las Vegas, released in April 2016, SL-1200 Grand Class 50th Anniversary Edition - A Limited edition of 1,200 units. Same as above, but high polish tonearm tube finish and different viscous material in the turntable feet. Both the G and GAE had an approximate MSRP price of £3,100 / €3,499 / $4,000.

SL-1210GAE
On 28 May 2020, Technics hosted an online launch event to reveal the SL-1210GAE as an alternative for the cancelled High End Munchen 2020 event at which they initially planned to reveal it. It is their 55th Anniversary Edition turntable - A limited edition of 1,210 units https:(//www.technics.com/us/news/0006.html.). Each unit has a plaque on it with its production number engraved in it. The SL-1210GAE is the black counterpart of the SL-1200GAE and is the same in every aspect except the color and the additional feature to turn off the strobe light. It had an approximate MSRP price of  €4,499

SL-1200GR

Announced in January 2017 CES, the GR model is a stripped-down budget version of the G, cutting the price tag more than half at an approximate MSRP of  £1,299 / $1,700 USD. It differs in body construction that it uses a more traditional cast aluminium design similar to the older decks and a one-piece cast platter which brings an overall weight difference between the G/GAE. The G/GAE and GR both use what are essentially the same 9-pole motor. Whereas the G has twin rotors, the GR has a single rotor, giving it less torque. The GR differs from the G in its use of a feedback generator coil system (as used in the original SL1200) instead of an optical encoder.

SL-1210GR
This is the same as the SL-1200GR except with a matte black finish.

MK7 models (2019-2021)
The MK7 models were launched as the first new Technics standard DJ turntable in approximately nine years. The MK7, along with the Grand Class models, no longer have "QUARTZ" printed on the plinth nor dust cover.

SL-1200MK7
Announced in January 2019 CES, the new model inherits the traditional design of the same series in all black and maintains the same operating ease, reliability and durability, while newly adding a coreless direct drive motor and other sound-enhancing technologies. It also features new DJ play functions and features, such as reverse playback, adjustable starting torque and brake speed, detachable terminals for power cable and phono cables (which was previously only available on the MK4 model), an option to select the strobe light indicator from red to blue (the 33/45 lights, 0-pitch reset light and the X2 pitch range light also change to match the color selected), and a new push-type structure for the white LED stylus illuminator.

SL-1210MK7
This is the same as the black SL-1200MK7, but intended for the European market. A silver coloured SL-1200MK7 was introduced in 2021.

SL-1210MK7R
Available from September 2020 globally, the SL-1210MK7R is a limited edition version of the SL-1210MK7 produced in collaboration with the Red Bull BC One international breakdancing competition. The SL-1210MK7R comes in Red Bull livery with red headshell, gold-coloured tone arm and decals.

Design strengths

The SL-1200 series was developed as a special project by Technics parent company Matsushita in an attempt to solve problems related to turntable design. The task included minimizing acoustic feedback, unwanted resonances, wow and flutter and speed errors. This was achieved by designing a heavy plinth (base) made of a non-resonant composite sandwiched between a cast alloy top plate and a solid rubber base.  In addition, the adjustable rubber-damped feet insulated against acoustic feedback, which can be a serious problem when operating a turntable in close proximity to loudspeakers (a common situation for DJs). The underside of the platter is coated with a 1.2mm layer of rubber to reduce ringing and the platter design is reliant on the use of the supplied 2mm rubber mat.
Most users remove the rubber turntable mat and replace it with a slip-mat for mixing. However, without the rubber mat, the platter is prone to resonance at 250 Hz when used near a large club sound system.

The drive system designed by Matsushita is direct-drive rather than the more commonly found belt-drive type, a less expensive design. The direct-drive design, which was developed to reduce wow and flutter, produces a very quiet turntable that, for a direct-drive turntable, has minimal motor and bearing noise, (although the bearing rumble does tend to become characteristic in well-used turntables). This was partially achieved through the fact that the SL1210/1200 made the platter a part of the motor mechanism.

On the underside of the platter a large magnet is placed over the spindle, surrounding the coils and forming the motor drive, thus eliminating loss through power transfer. The SL-1200 utilizes a Frequency Generator Servo Control Quartz Lock system that is claimed to produce the most accurate and consistent speed possible. The system is immune to static and dynamic stylus drag which otherwise cause unwanted speed variances that change the pitch and tempo of the music.

Termination
On 1 November 2010, Panasonic made the following statement on the DMC World DJ Championships home page.

Panasonic reactive statement - Production of analogue turntables has ceased

Panasonic has confirmed that it ceased the production of its Technics-branded analogue turntables this autumn.

After more than 35 years as a leading manufacturer of analogue turntables, Panasonic has regretfully taken the decision to leave this market. However, Panasonic will continue to sell headphones under the Technics brand. 

We are sure that retailers and consumers will understand that our product range has to reflect the accelerating transformation of the entire audio market from analogue to digital.

In addition, the number of component suppliers serving the analogue market has dwindled in recent years and we brought forward the decision to leave the market rather than risk being unable to fulfil future orders because of a lack of parts.

Panasonic employees who have been working on the analogue turntable range have been redeployed elsewhere within Panasonic - many of them continuing to work in Panasonic's Audio Video Business Unit.

Re-launch petition
Due to the increasing popularity of vinyl by DJs, a petition has been underway (and a petition page on Facebook.) for the re-launch of the Technics SL1200/SL1210 series turntables.  As of September 2015 the petition had 27,000 supporters, while 35,000 is the target Panasonic requested. On January 5, 2016 Technics agreed to relaunch both the SL-1200G and the SL-1200GAE

Resuming production
At the 2016 Consumer Electronics Show in Las Vegas, Panasonic announced it would be resuming production with a new line of turntables, beginning with the Limited Edition SL-1200GAE 

At the 2019 Consumer Electronics Show, Panasonic confirmed future production of a new turntable respectively the SL-1200 Mk7 in matte black, adding new features, fixing known issues with previous models, and all new lighter construction of aluminum and fiber glass.

References

External links
 Technics website
 Panasonic (Technics) product page [From Archive.org as link has now been removed from Technics.com website]
 Frequently asked questions on Hyperreal on the Technics SL-1200MK2/SL-1210MK2 Turntables
 Technics SL-1200 MK2 at Vinyl Heaven - a hi-fi perspective
 Technics SL-1200 MK2 at TNT Audio - an audiophile review
 Technics SL-1200 History - With timescales and images. (Archive.org)
 Technics 1200 History - Technics global site

Audiovisual introductions in 1972
DJ equipment
Electronic dance music
Electronic musical instruments
Hip hop production
Japanese inventions
Musical instruments invented in the 1970s
Panasonic products
Turntables
Turntablism